Dubina or Dubyna (Cyrillic: Дубина) is a gender-neutral Slavic surname originating from the noun dubina, meaning a stupid, stubborn person. It may refer to the following notable people:
Joel Fredrick Dubina (born 1947), American attorney and jurist 
Julia Dubina (born 1984), Georgian triple jumper
Martin Dubina, Slovak ice hockey player 
Oleh Dubyna (born 1959), Ukrainian businessman in the oil industry
Vitali Dubina (born 1980), Russian-Ukrainian pair skater

References